Punta Arenas is a city in the far south of Chile.

Punta Arenas may also refer to:

 Punta Arenas, Peru
 Playa Punta Arenas, a beach on Margarita Island, Venezuela
 Point Arena, California, United States, formerly Punta Arenas
 Punta Arenas, a sand spit partially sheltering the waterfront of Bahía de los Ángeles in Mexico

See also
Puntarenas, a city in Costa Rica